Prosperidad is Spanish for prosperity. It may refer to the following places:
 Prosperidad, municipality o the Philippines and capital of the province of Agusan del Sur
 Prosperidad (Madrid), a ward in the city of Madrid, Spain
Prosperidad (Madrid Metro), a station on Line 4 serving the Madrid ward